Eng Mohammed Hassan Qatana is a Syrian agricultural engineer and politician. He has served as Agriculture and Agrarian Reform Minister since 2020.

Career
2004–2011: Director of Planning and statistics 
2008–2010: Director of Agricultural Production Support Fund and Director of Planning and International Cooperation
before 2020: Director of World Food Programme project in Syria

Personal life
Married with two children

See also 

 First Hussein Arnous government
 Second Hussein Arnous government

References 

Living people

Year of birth missing (living people)
20th-century births

21st-century Syrian politicians
Agriculture ministers of Syria
21st-century agronomists